A Very English Scandal is a British television comedy-drama series. The three-part 2018 serial is based on John Preston's 2016 book of the same name. It is a dramatisation of the 1976–1979 Jeremy Thorpe scandal and more than 15 years of events leading up to it.

The producers followed up A Very English Scandal in 2021 with the series A Very British Scandal, about the Argyll divorce case.

Plot

In 1965, Jeremy Thorpe, a Liberal Member of Parliament, must contend with disgruntled ex-lover Norman Josiffe, whom he met in 1961 and had a relationship with for several years. Thorpe had met Norman when the latter was a 21-year-old stable boy in Oxfordshire and wrote many letters to him, which Norman kept. Norman, who could never quite hold down a job, particularly not after having lost his National Insurance card, was unstable and had a penchant for drama and self-expression, both of which proved increasingly hard to deal with. When Thorpe grew tired of Norman and insisted that he leave the house he had arranged and paid for in London, the young man began to make threats. Thorpe fears exposure and the end of his political career. His fellow Liberal MP, Peter Bessell, keeps Norman silent for the time being with small amounts of money. Norman also requests a new National Insurance card from Thorpe but his request is denied since it would link Thorpe to Norman.

By 1968, Thorpe has been elected as the Leader of the Liberal Party and is the youngest man to lead the party in a century. He marries naive young Caroline Allpass and they have a baby boy. Norman has become more unstable; going by the name Norman Scott, although he gets on well with horses and dogs, he fails to keep a job or relationship, drinks too much and uses drugs. He calls Caroline and tells her about his past romance with her husband. She is stunned by this revelation.

Caroline dies in 1970, after swerving into on-coming traffic; Thorpe mourns her death. Bessell moves to the United States to escape his financial troubles. Norman continues trying to get a new National Insurance card and have his story be heard but with no success. Thorpe considers having him killed but the plans are repeatedly postponed.

In 1973, Thorpe marries Marion Stein, Countess of Harewood and continues to climb the political ladder. Unfortunately, Thorpe encounters Norman by chance, panics and tells David Holmes (an old friend from Oxford) to arrange for Norman's murder. Andrew Newton is hired for £10,000. He tries and fails spectacularly, only killing Norman's dog. Norman immediately reports the crime to the police and is convinced it was ordered by Thorpe.

This results in the 1976–1979 Thorpe affair. Newton is put on trial and convicted of attempting to do harm to Norman. Soon afterwards, Norman requests from the police two letters from Thorpe he had given them in the 1960s. Thorpe decides to forestall Norman by publishing the letters himself with his own version of events and resigns as Leader of the Liberal Party in May 1976. He runs for re-election to Parliament but loses his North Devon seat to Tony Speller of the Conservatives.

Thorpe, Holmes and two other accused co-conspirators are put on trial for conspiring to murder Norman. Thorpe hires George Carman, a combative lawyer, to defend him. In May 1979, the trial begins and the media reports its every detail. Norman testifies, explaining that what he mainly wants is his National Insurance card and to have his story acknowledged. Chief Justice Cantley is flagrantly biased and sides with Thorpe in his instructions to the jury, which finds Thorpe and his co-conspirators not guilty.

The end credits note that Thorpe never held another public office. He and Marion remained married until her death in March 2014 and Thorpe died nine months later. Bessell remained in the United States until his death in 1985. Norman is still alive, owns 11 dogs and still does not have a National Insurance card.

Cast and characters

 Hugh Grant as Jeremy Thorpe
 Ben Whishaw as Norman Josiffe/Norman Scott
 Alex Jennings as Peter Bessell
 Patricia Hodge as Ursula Thorpe
 Monica Dolan as Marion Thorpe
 Paul Hilton as David Holmes
 Jonathan Hyde as David Napley
 Eve Myles as Gwen Parry-Jones
 David Bamber as Arthur Gore, 8th Earl of Arran
 Jason Watkins as Emlyn Hooson
 Blake Harrison as Andrew Newton
 Michelle Fox as Lyn
 Adrian Scarborough as George Carman
 Michele Dotrice as Edna Friendship
 Alice Orr-Ewing as Caroline Allpass
 Michael Culkin as Reggie Maudling
 Susan Wooldridge as Fiona Gore, Countess of Arran
 Anthony O'Donnell as Leo Abse
 Naomi Battrick as Diana Stainton
 Dyfan Dwyfor as George Deakin

Episodes

Production

Development
The first series was written by Russell T Davies and directed by Stephen Frears, with Hugh Grant starring as Thorpe and Ben Whishaw as Scott. The BBC television drama was first announced on 4 May 2017, with Grant already cast as Thorpe. Ben Whishaw was announced to join the cast in August, and the rest of the cast was announced in October. Along with the further casting announcement, Amazon took the US rights for the show.

Filming
Filming took place in London, Manchester, Buckinghamshire, Devon, Hertfordshire and South Wales. Although scenes were filmed outside the Houses of Parliament, the inner courts, interior hallways and staircase were represented by Manchester Town Hall, which is built in the same Gothic Revival style as the Palace of Westminster. The offices of Thorpe and other MPs were created at Bulstrode Park, a vacant country house in Buckinghamshire. The grounds of Bulstrode were also used for the night time assassination attempt scene set on Exmoor.

The town of Hertford was used as a stand-in for 1970s Barnstaple, while Saunton Sands in North Devon stood in for the California beach where Peter Bessell (Alex Jennings) lives in a seaside shack. Bridgend in South Wales stood in for Dublin, while Norman's period living in Wales was filmed in and around Monknash. The show was able to film in the lobby and exterior of the Old Bailey in London, where the show's climactic scenes take place. A Very English Scandal was the first production ever to be granted permission to film in Court One of the Old Bailey but they had to decline because of tight time restrictions and filmed the court scenes at a courthouse in Kingston upon Thames.

Release
The series premiered on BBC One on 20 May 2018 and on Amazon Prime on 29 June 2018. The DVD was released on 2 July 2018.

Critical reception
A Very English Scandal received very positive reviews. On Rotten Tomatoes, it holds an approval rating of 97% based on 68 reviews, with an average rating of 8.80/10. Rotten Tomatoes's critical consensus reads, "Hugh Grant and Ben Whishaw impress in A Very English Scandal, an equally absorbing and appalling look at British politics and society". Metacritic gives the miniseries a weighted average rating of 84 out of 100, based on 17 critics, indicating "universal acclaim". In 2019, the series was ranked 76th on The Guardian'''s list of the 100 best TV shows of the 21st century.

The real Norman Scott spoke out about the show's characterisation of him and its portrayal of his life. He told the Irish News'' that "Artistic license is fine but this isn't my story. And there's nothing funny about someone trying to kill you...I'm portrayed as this poor, mincing, little gay person ... I also come across as a weakling and I've never been a weakling".

Awards and nominations

References

External links
 
 
 

2018 British television series debuts
2018 British television series endings
2010s British crime drama television series
2010s British LGBT-related television series
2010s British television miniseries
2010s British political television series
2010s British LGBT-related drama television series
Amazon Prime Video original programming
BBC television dramas
English-language television shows
Gay-related television shows
Television shows based on British novels
Television series by Sony Pictures Television
Television series set in the 1960s
Television series set in the 1970s
Television shows filmed in the United Kingdom
British political drama television series